The Great War of Archimedes (アルキメデスの大戦, Arukimedesu no taisen) is a 2019 Japanese historical film about the building of the battleship Yamato. Based on a manga by Norifusa Mita, the movie is a fictionalized telling of the political maneuvers, specifically around budget and cost issues, that led to the decision to build the Yamato. The movie was dubbed into various languages and distributed worldwide.

Plot
To replace an aging battleship, a new super battleship (the future Yamato) is proposed to the Navy. Admirals Yamamoto and Nagano believe that battleships are becoming obsolete, and advocate building a new aircraft carrier instead, but they are opposed by the Navy's old guard.

Yamamoto and Nagano enlist Tadashi Kai, an eccentric, headstrong, and pacifist mathematics prodigy on the autism spectrum with an obsession for measuring things. Kai is at first unwilling to help Yamamoto and Nagano, but becomes convinced that a super battleship will be seen by other nations as an aggressive threat, leading Japan and the world toward war, and agrees to work for them.  
  
Much of the film revolves around Kai's efforts to prove that the cost of the Yamato will be much higher than its designers claim. This he finally does, using mathematical formulas that, in a dramatic scene, are shown to be very accurate when applied to the cost of earlier ships. Kai thus demonstrates that the battleship will cost about double the estimate. But battleship champion Shigetarō Shimada, when caught in his lie, appeals to patriotism: he had deliberately underestimated the cost of the battleship so that it would be approved, as he believed it to be vitally necessary for the Navy. Shimada's scheme was to underpay the shipyard for the cost of the battleship, making up the difference by overpaying for some cruisers. Despite the exposed fraud, the proposal to the build the Yamato is approved.

Cast
 Masaki Suda as Lt. Commander / Commander Tadashi Kai
 Hiroshi Tachi as Rear Admiral / Admiral Isoroku Yamamoto
 Tasuku Emoto as Ensign Shōjirō Tanaka
 Minami Hamabe as Kyōko Ozaki
 Min Tanaka as Vice Admiral Tadamichi Hirayama
 Jun Kunimura as Vice Admiral Osami Nagano
 Isao Hashizume as Rear Admiral Shigetarō Shimada
 Eita Okuno as Sub-lieutenant Kunihiko Takato 
 Katsuya Kobayashi as Admiral Mineo Ōsumi
 Hajime Yamazaki as Rear Admiral Yoshio Fujioka
 Fumiyo Kohinata as Captain Sekizō Uno
 Shōfukutei Tsurube II as Kiyoshi Ōsato
 Kenichi Yajima as Tomekichi Ozaki

Production
Voice actors for the dubbing into English include Luis Bermudez, Brent Mukai, Lizzy Laurenti, and Dylan Mobley.

Accolades
At the 2020 Japanese Academy Awards, Tasuku Emoto was nominated in the Best Supporting Actor category, and Masaki Suda was nominated in the Best Actor category, for their work in this film.

References

External links

2019 films
Japanese historical films
2010s Japanese-language films
Films directed by Takashi Yamazaki
Live-action films based on manga
Films set in the 1930s
Films about navies